John Nissen is a British inventor, technologist and musician. He was a music scholar at Bryanston and a student at Clare College, Cambridge, where he obtained a degree in natural sciences.

Details

Early career
Nissen worked for many years at GEC in telecommunications as a software engineer, designing the instruction set and real-time operating system for Mark 2BL processor, possibly the world's first commercial fault-tolerant load-balancing multiprocessing computer, which was selected for use in the control of System X.  He had also worked on specification and programming languages, contributing to the development of SDL and Ada, later joining GEC Software as research director.

SMART Award
In 1996 Nissen won a SMART award and set up Cloudworld Ltd to develop assistive technology, with the mission to use computer-based systems to help disabled and disadvantaged people to improve their quality of life.  This led to the development of the WordAloud product and invention of the Tactaphone.

His company, Cloudworld, produces assistive readers (notably the WordAloud product) and researches into literacy and technology, including in the developing world such as Sri Lanka.

Musical career
Nissen is an accomplished 'cellist and double bass player.  He had played in the National Youth Orchestra, the Cambridge University Musical Society orchestra under Sir David Willcocks, and the Salomon Orchestra, one of London's finest amateur orchestras.  He had played professionally in the band for Royal Shakespeare Company plays.  And he had performed concertos, including Dvořák's 'cello concerto, and solos, including Bach unaccompanied 'cello sonatas.

Investigating geo-engineering
Since early 2008, Nissen has been investigating geo-engineering, which he believes that is urgently needed to save the Arctic sea ice.  He has developed a theory that the system of Gulf Stream and Arctic ice cap serve as a thermostatic control system, for preventing the planet from heating above a certain temperature, approximately the current global temperature.  The Arctic sea ice is an essential part of that control system, and it threatens to disappear (at end summer) possibly as soon as 2012 but likely by 2030 or 2040, thus disabling the thermostatic control of the planet, and allowing massive methane discharge from permafrost and disintegration of the Greenland ice sheet.

References

Year of birth missing (living people)
Living people
People educated at Bryanston School
Alumni of Clare College, Cambridge
British inventors